Reinaldo Tsuguio Sato (Jiro) (born October 25, 1980) is a Brazilian baseball designated hitter. He plays for the Yamaha club in the Japanese Industrial League.

Career
He was signed by the Yakult Swallows and played from 1999–2003 when he was released. He has played in the industrial leagues since then.

International career
He represented Brazil at the 1999 Pan American Games, 2003 Baseball World Cup, 2005 Baseball World Cup, 2007 Pan American Games, 2008 Olympics qualifying rounds and  2013 World Baseball Classic and 2019 Pan American Games Qualifier.

References

External links
Baseball America

1980 births
Living people
Baseball players at the 1999 Pan American Games
Baseball players at the 2007 Pan American Games
Brazilian baseball players
Brazilian people of Japanese descent
Pan American Games competitors for Brazil
People from Mogi das Cruzes
Sportspeople from São Paulo (state)
Yakult Swallows players
2013 World Baseball Classic players